Yana Urqu (Quechua yana, black, urqu mountain, "black mountain", Hispanicized spelling Yana Orjo, erroneously also Yana Orja) is a mountain in the Cusco Region in Peru, about  high. It is situated in the Quispicanchi Province, at the border of the districts Ocongate and Quiquijana.

An intermittent stream originates south of Yana Urqu. It flows through the Ninapampa (Ninabamba) or Qunchupata (Cunchopata) valley to reach the river Huch'uymayu (Quechua for "little river", Uchuymayu). Huch'uymayu is a right tributary of the Willkanuta River. The confluence is north of Quiquijana.

References 

Mountains of Peru
Mountains of Cusco Region